Takafumi Otsuka  (born August 22, 1986) is a Japanese mixed martial artist. He competed in the bantamweight, featherweight and lightweight division. A professional mixed martial artist since 2006, Otsuka is a two-time DEEP Bantamweight Champion and a one-time DEEP Featherweight Champion.

Mixed martial arts career

Early career
Otsuka made his professional MMA debut in October 2006 and lost the bout via submission in the second round.

Deep
Although Otsuka fought for various promotions over the first ten years of his career, he primarily competed for the Deep promotion in Japan with over 25 bouts held there.

Otsuka challenged Dokonjonosuke Mishima for the DEEP Featherweight Championship at Deep: 43 Impact on August 23, 2009. He won the fight and claimed the title via unanimous decision.

Otsuka made his first title defense attempt against Yoshiro Maeda at Deep 57: Impact on February 18, 2012. However, he lost the title via second-round submission.

In April 2014, Otsuka faced Kenji Osawa for the vacant DEEP Bantamweight Championship at Deep: 66 Impact. He won the bout and title via unanimous decision.

Rizin FF
In July 2017, Otsuka made his debut for Rizin Fighting Federation. He faced Anthony Birchak in the first round of the Rizin Bantamweight Grand Prix on July 30, 2017 at Rizin 6 and won the fight via split decision.

Shooto
Otsuka made his promotional debut in Shooto against Tatsuya Ando at Shooto 1123 on November 23, 2020. He won the fight via technical knockout after Ando injured his knee.

Otsuka then challenged Ryo Okada for the Shooto Featherweight Championship at Shooto 0320 on March 20, 2021. He lost the fight via unanimous decision.

Rizin Bantamweight Grand Prix 2021 
Otsuka faced Hiroki Yamashita in the opening round of the Bantamweight Grand Prix at Rizin 29 on May 30, 2021.  He won the bout via unanimous decision.

Otsuka was scheduled to face Hiromasa Ougikubo in the quarterfinals on September 19, 2021 at Rizin 30. He lost the fight by unanimous decision.

Championships and Accomplishments
Deep
Deep Bantamweight Championship (Two times)
Three Successful Title Defenses
Deep Featherweight Championship (One time)

Mixed martial arts record

|-
|Loss
|align=center|29–19–2
|Hiromasa Ougikubo
|Decision (unanimous)
|Rizin 30
|
|align=center|3
|align=center|5:00
|Saitama, Japan
|
|-
| Win
| align=center |29–18–2
|Hiroki Yamashita
|Decision (unanimous)
|Rizin 29
|
|align=center|3
|align=center|5:00
|Osaka, Japan
|
|-
|Loss
|align=center|28–18–2
| Ryo Okada
| Decision (unanimous)
| Shooto 0320
| 
|align=center|3
|align=center|5:00
| Tokyo, Japan
| 
|-
|Win
|align=center|28–17–2
| Tatsuya Ando
| TKO (knee injury)
| Shooto 1123
| 
|align=center|1
|align=center|2:12
| Tokyo, Japan
|
|-
|Loss
|align=center|27–17–2
| Yuki Motoya
| Decision (unanimous)
| Deep: 94 Impact
| 
|align=center|3
|align=center|5:00
| Tokyo, Japan
| 
|-
|Win
|align=center|27–16–2
| Yuki Takano
| Decision (unanimous)
| Deep: 93 Impact
| 
|align=center|3
|align=center|5:00
| Tokyo, Japan
| 
|-
|Win
|align=center|26–16–2
| Rikuto Shirakawa
| TKO (shoulder injury)
| Deep: 91 Impact
| 
|align=center|1
|align=center|0:26
| Tokyo, Japan
| 
|-
|Loss
|align=center|25–16–2
| Trevin Jones
| Submission (rear-naked choke)
| Deep: 89 Impact
| 
|align=center|2
|align=center|1:40
| Tokyo, Japan
| 
|-
|Win
|align=center|25–15–2
| Seiji Akao
| Decision (unanimous)
| Deep: 87 Impact
| 
|align=center|3
|align=center|5:00
| Tokyo, Japan
| 
|-
|Loss
|align=center|24–15–2
| Victor Henry
| KO (kick to the body)
| Deep: 85 Impact
| 
|align=center|3
|align=center|1:36
| Tokyo, Japan
| 
|-
|Loss
|align=center|24–14–2
| Shintaro Ishiwatari
| Decision (unanimous)
|Rizin World Grand Prix 2017: Final Round
| 
|align=center|3
|align=center|15:00
| Saitama, Japan
|  2017 Rizin Bantamweight Grand-Prix Semi-Finals
|-
| Win
| align=center| 24–13–2
| Khalid Taha
| Submission (guillotine choke)
| Rizin World Grand Prix 2017: 2nd Round
| 
| align=center| 3
| align=center| 7:22
| Saitama, Japan
|  2017 Rizin Bantamweight Grand-Prix Quarter-Finals
|-
| Win
| align=center| 23–13–2
| Anthony Birchak
| Decision (split)
|  Rizin World Grand Prix 2017: Opening Round - Part 1
| 
| align=center| 2
| align=center| 5:00
| Saitama, Japan
|  2017 Rizin Bantamweight Grand-Prix Opening Round
|-
| Win
| align=center| 22–13–2
| Koichi Ishizuka
| Decision (split)
| Deep: 77 Impact x DEEP JEWELS 13
| 
| align=center| 3
| align=center| 5:00
| Tokyo, Japan
| Defended the DEEP Bantamweight Championship.
|-
| Win
| align=center| 21–13–2
| Baataryn Azjavkhlan
| Submission (rear-naked choke)
| Deep: 77 Impact x DEEP JEWELS 13
| 
| align=center| 3
| align=center| 5:00
| Tokyo, Japan
|
|-
| Win
| align=center| 20–13–2
| Daisuke Endo
| Decision (unanimous)
| Deep: 75 Impact: 15th Anniversary
| 
| align=center| 3
| align=center| 5:00
| Tokyo, Japan
| 
|-
| Draw
| align=center| 19–13–2
| Ken Saotome
| Technical Draw (accidental clash of heads)
| Deep: 74 Impact
| 
| align=center| 1
| align=center| 0:30
| Tokyo, Japan
| 
|-
| Win
| align=center| 19–13–1
| Toshiaki Kitada
| Decision (unanimous)
| Deep: 72 Impact
| 
| align=center| 3
| align=center| 5:00
| Tokyo, Japan
| Defended the DEEP Bantamweight Championship.
|-
| Loss
| align=center| 18–13–1
| Shintaro Ishiwatari
| TKO (punch)
| Deep: Dream Impact 2014: Omisoka Special
| 
| align=center| 1
| align=center| 3:30
| Saitama, Japan
| 
|-
| Win
| align=center| 18–12–1
| Toshinori Tsunemura
| Submission (guillotine choke)
| Deep: 69 Impact
| 
| align=center| 3
| align=center| 4:46
| Tokyo, Japan
| Defended the DEEP Bantamweight Championship.
|-
| Win
| align=center| 17–12–1
| Kenji Osawa
| Decision (unanimous)
| Deep: 66 Impact
| 
| align=center| 3
| align=center| 5:00
| Tokyo, Japan
| Won Vacant DEEP Bantamweight Championship
|-
| Win
| align=center| 16–12–1
| Toshiaki Kitada
| Decision (unanimous)
| Deep: Cage Impact 2013
| 
| align=center| 3
| align=center| 5:00
| Tokyo, Japan
| 
|-
| Loss
| align=center| 15–12–1
| Yoon Jun Lee
| Decision (unanimous)
| Road FC 12: Road Fighting Championship 12
| 
| align=center| 3
| align=center| 5:00
| Wonju, Gwandong, South Korea
| 
|-
| Win
| align=center| 15–11–1
| Makoto Kamaya
| Decision (unanimous)
| Deep: 62 Impact
| 
| align=center| 3
| align=center| 5:00
| Tokyo, Japan
| 
|-
| Win
| align=center| 14–11–1
| Seiji Akao
| Decision (unanimous)
| Deep: Cage Impact 2012 in Tokyo: 2nd Round
| 
| align=center| 2
| align=center| 5:00
| Tokyo, Japan
| 
|-
| Win
| align=center| 13–11–1
| Naohiro Mizuno
| Decision (unanimous)
| Deep: 60 Impact
| 
| align=center| 2
| align=center| 5:00
| Tokyo, Japan
| 
|-
| Loss
| align=center| 12–11–1
| Tatsumitsu Wada
| Decision (majority)
| Deep: Cage Impact 2012 in Tokyo: Over Again
| 
| align=center| 3
| align=center| 5:00
| Tokyo, Japan
| 
|-
| Loss
| align=center| 12–10–1
| Yoshiro Maeda
| Submission (rear-naked choke)
| Deep: 57 Impact
| 
| align=center| 2
| align=center| 3:13
| Tokyo, Japan
| 
|-
| Loss
| align=center| 12–9–1
| Bibiano Fernandes
| Technical Submission (rear-naked choke)
| Dream 17
| 
| align=center| 1
| align=center| 0:41
| Saitama, Saitama, Japan
| 
|-
| Win
| align=center| 12–8–1
| Hiroshi Nakamura
| Decision (unanimous)
| Deep: 54 Impact
| 
| align=center| 3
| align=center| 5:00
| Tokyo, Japan
| 
|-
| Loss
| align=center| 11–8–1
| Kenji Osawa
| Decision (split)
| Dream: Fight for Japan!
| 
| align=center| 2
| align=center| 5:00
| Saitama, Saitama, Japan
| 
|-
| Win
| align=center| 11–7–1
| Tomohiko Hori
| Decision (unanimous)
| Deep: 51 Impact
| 
| align=center| 3
| align=center| 5:00
| Tokyo, Japan
| 
|-
| Loss
| align=center| 10–7–1
| Yoshiro Maeda
| Decision (majority)
| Deep: 50 Impact
| 
| align=center| 3
| align=center| 5:00
| Tokyo, Japan
| 
|-
| Loss
| align=center| 10–6–1
| Koichiro Matsumoto
| Decision (split)
| Deep: 48 Impact
| 
| align=center| 3
| align=center| 5:00
| Tokyo, Japan
| 
|-
| Loss
| align=center| 10–5–1
| Kazuyuki Miyata
| Decision (split)
| Dream 14
| 
| align=center| 3
| align=center| 5:00
| Saitama, Saitama, Japan
| 
|-
| Win
| align=center| 10–4–1
| Takeshi Yamazaki
| Decision (unanimous)
| Deep: 46 Impact
| 
| align=center| 3
| align=center| 5:00
| Tokyo, Japan
| 
|-
| Win
| align=center| 9–4–1
| Dokonjonosuke Mishima
| Decision (unanimous)
| Deep: 43 Impact
| 
| align=center| 3
| align=center| 5:00
| Tokyo, Japan
| 
|-
| Loss
| align=center| 8–4–1
| Bibiano Fernandes
| Decision (unanimous)
| Dream 7: Featherweight Grand Prix 2009 First Round
| 
| align=center| 2
| align=center| 5:00
| Saitama, Saitama, Japan
| 
|-
| Win
| align=center| 8–3–1
| Shoji Maruyama
| Decision (unanimous)
| Deep: 39 Impact
| 
| align=center| 3
| align=center| 5:00
| Tokyo, Japan
| 
|-
| Win
| align=center| 7–3–1
| Masanori Kanehara
| Decision (split)
| Deep: 38 Impact
| 
| align=center| 2
| align=center| 5:00
| Tokyo, Japan
| 
|-
| Loss
| align=center| 6–3–1
| Rafael dos Anjos
| Decision (split)
| Fury FC 6: High Voltage
| 
| align=center| 3
| align=center| 5:00
| Rio de Janeiro, Brazil
| 
|-
| Win
| align=center| 6–2–1
| Isamu Sugiuchi
| TKO (slam and punches)
| Deep: clubDeep Tokyo
| 
| align=center| 1
| align=center| 3:51
| Tokyo, Japan
| 
|-
| Win
| align=center| 5–2–1
| Shun Takahashi
| Submission (rear-naked choke)
| Smoker's: The Smoker's Party 1
| 
| align=center| 1
| align=center| 1:39
| Tokyo, Japan
| 
|-
| Win
| align=center| 4–2–1
| Rodrigo Ruiz
| TKO (punches)
| Fury FC 5: Final Conflict
| 
| align=center| 2
| align=center| 3:12
| São Paulo, Brazil
| 
|-
| Draw
| align=center| 3–2–1
| Seiji Ozuka
| Draw
| Deep: 31 Impact
| 
| align=center| 2
| align=center| 5:00
| Tokyo, Japan
| 
|-
| Win
| align=center| 3–2
| Motomare Takahashi
| Submission (rear-naked choke)
| Deep: clubDeep Tokyo
| 
| align=center| 1
| align=center| 2:42
| Tokyo, Japan
| 
|-
| Win
| align=center| 2–2
| Leandro Issa
| TKO (punches)
| Fury FC 3: Reloaded
| 
| align=center| 3
| align=center| N/A
| São Paulo, Brazil
| 
|-
| Win
| align=center| 1–2
| Luiz Andrade I
| Decision (unanimous)
| MARS 6: Rapid Fire
| 
| align=center| 2
| align=center| 5:00
| Yokohama, Japan
| 
|-
| Loss
| align=center| 0–2
| Toshiaki Kitada
| Decision (unanimous)
| Deep: clubDeep Tokyo: Future King Tournament 2006
| 
| align=center| 1
| align=center| 5:00
| Tokyo, Japan
| 
|-
| Loss
| align=center| 0–1
| Tashiro Nishiuchi
| Submission (rear-naked choke)
| MARS: Bodog Fight
| 
| align=center| 2
| align=center| 3:05
| Tokyo, Japan
|

See also
List of male mixed martial artists

References

External links
 

1986 births
Japanese male mixed martial artists
Bantamweight mixed martial artists
Featherweight mixed martial artists
Lightweight mixed martial artists
Mixed martial artists utilizing wrestling
Mixed martial artists utilizing Brazilian jiu-jitsu
Japanese practitioners of Brazilian jiu-jitsu
Living people